Willy Vos (born 15 October 1952) is a German karateka. He won multiple medals in the European Karate Championships and Karate World Championships in Kumite.

References 

1952 births
Sportspeople from Freiburg im Breisgau
Living people
German male karateka
20th-century German people